Best Actress is the name of an award which is presented by various film, television and theatre organisations, festivals, and people's awards to leading actresses in a film, television series, television film or play. The first Best Actress award was awarded for acting in a film, on May 16, 1929 by the Academy of Motion Picture Arts and Sciences (AMPAS) at the Academy Awards to Janet Gaynor for her role of Diane in 7th Heaven, Angela in Street Angel and The Wife - Indre in Sunrise: A Song of Two Humans. In theatre, it was first awarded on April 6, 1947 by the American Theatre Wing and The Broadway League at the Tony Awards to Ingrid Bergman for her role of Mary Grey / Joan of Arc in Joan of Lorraine and to Helen Hayes for her role of Addie in Happy Birthday. In television, it was first awarded on January 23, 1951 by Academy of Television Arts & Sciences at the Primetime Emmy Awards to Gertrude Berg for her role of Molly in The Goldbergs. In a film festival, presented as the Volpi Cup, it was first awarded between August 1–20, 1934 by the Venice Film Festival to Katharine Hepburn for her role of Josephine 'Jo' March in Little Women.

Film awards 
 AACTA Award for Best Actress in a Leading Role
 AACTA International Award for Best Actress
 Academy Award for Best Actress
Annecy Italian Film Festival Best Actress Award
 Ariel Award for Best Actress
 Asian Film Award for Best Actress
 Asianet Film Award for Best Actress
 BAFTA Award for Best Actress in a Leading Role
 Babisas Award for Best Actress
 Bachsas Award for Best Actress
 Bangladesh National Film Award for Best Actress
 Bavarian Film Awards (Best Acting)
 Bengal Film Journalists' Association – Best Actress Award
 BET Award for Best Actor & Actress
 BIFA Award for Best Performance by an Actress in a British Independent Film
 Black Reel Award for Best Actress
 Bodil Award for Best Actress in a Leading Role
 Bollywood Movie Award – Best Actress
 Boston Society of Film Critics Award for Best Actress
Canadian Screen Award for Best Actress
Cannes FIlm Festival Best Actress Award
 César Award for Best Actress
 Chicago Film Critics Association Award for Best Actress
 CineMAA Award for Best Actress
 Citra Award for Best Actress
CJFB Performance Award for Best Actress
 Critics' Choice Movie Award for Best Actress
 Critics' Choice Movie Award for Best Actress in an Action Movie
 Critics' Choice Movie Award for Best Actress in a Comedy
 Dallas–Fort Worth Film Critics Association Award for Best Actress
 David di Donatello for Best Actress
 Edda Award for Best Actor or Actress
 Empire Award for Best Actress
 Empire Award for Best British Actress
 European Film Award for Best Actress
 FAMAS Award for Best Actress
 Filmfare Award for Best Actress - Hindi
 Filmfare Award for Best Actress – Kannada
 Filmfare Award for Best Actress – Malayalam
 Filmfare Award for Best Actress – Tamil
 Filmfare Award for Best Actress – Telugu
 Florida Film Critics Circle Award for Best Actress
 Genie Award for Best Performance by a Foreign Actress
 GIFA Best Actress Award
 GIFA Critics Best Actress Award
 Golden Arena for Best Actress (Pula Film Festival)
 Golden Calf for Best Actress (Netherlands Film Festival)
 Golden Eagle Award for Best Actress (China)
 Golden Eagle Award for Best Actress (Russia)
 Golden Globe Award for Best Actress in a Motion Picture – Drama
 Golden Globe Award for Best Actress in a Motion Picture – Comedy or Musical
 Golden Goblet Award for Best Actress (Shanghai International Film Festival)
 Golden Horse Award for Best Leading Actress
 Golden Rooster Award for Best Actress
 Goya Award for Best Actress
 Goya Award for Best New Actress
 Guldbagge Award for Best Actress in a Leading Role
 Hong Kong Film Award for Best Actress
 Hundred Flowers Award for Best Actress
 IIFA Award for Best Actress
 Independent Spirit Award for Best Female Lead
 ITFA Best Actress Award
 ITFA Best New Actress Award
 Japan Academy Prize for Outstanding Performance by an Actress in a Leading Role
 Kerala State Film Award for Best Actress
 London Film Critics' Circle Award for Actress of the Year
 Los Angeles Film Critics Association Award for Best Actress
 Lumières Award for Best Actress
 Lux Style Award for Best Film Actress
 Meril Prothom Alo Award for Best Actress
 Nandi Award for Best Actress
 Nastro d'Argento for Best Actress
 National Board of Review Award for Best Actress
 National Film Award for Best Actress
 National Society of Film Critics Award for Best Actress
 NAACP Image Award for Outstanding Actress in a Motion Picture
 New York Film Critics Circle Award for Best Actress
 Online Film Critics Society Award for Best Actress
 Polish Academy Award for Best Actress
 Robert Award for Best Actress in a Leading Role
 San Diego Film Critics Society Award for Best Actress
 San Francisco Film Critics Circle Award for Best Actress
 Santosham Best Actress Award
 Sarasaviya Best Actress Award
 Satellite Award for Best Actress – Motion Picture
 Saturn Award for Best Actress
 Screen Actors Guild Award for Outstanding Performance by a Female Actor in a Leading Role
 Screen Award for Best Actress
 Screen Award for Best Actress (Critics)
 Screen Award for Best Actress (Popular Choice)
 Shanghai Film Critics Award for Best Actress
SIIMA Award for Best Actress (Telugu)
Silver Bear for Best Actress (Berlin International Film Festival)
 Silver Hugo Award for Best Actress (Chicago International Film Festival)
Silver Shell for Best Actress (San Sebastián International Film Festival)
 St. Louis Gateway Film Critics Association Award for Best Actress
 Stardust Award for Best Actress
 Stardust Award for Best Actress in a Comedy or Romance
 Stardust Award for Best Actress in a Drama
 Stardust Award for Best Actress in a Thriller or Action
 Tamil Nadu State Film Award for Best Actress
Tokyo International Film Festival Best Actress Award
 Toronto Film Critics Association Award for Best Actress
 Vancouver Film Critics Circle Award for Best Actress
 Vancouver Film Critics Circle Award for Best Actress in a Canadian Film
Vietnam Film Festival Best Actress Award
 Vijay Award for Best Actress
Volpi Cup (Venice Film Festival)
 Washington D.C. Area Film Critics Association Award for Best Actress
 Zee Cine Award for Best Actor – Female
 Zee Cine Critics Award for Best Actor – Female

Television awards 
 AACTA Award for Best Lead Actress in a Television Drama
 Golden Bell Award for Best Actress in a Miniseries or Television Film
 Golden Bell Award for Best Actress
 Black Reel Award for Best Actress: T.V. Movie/Cable
 British Academy Television Award for Best Actress
 British Soap Award for Best Actress
 Daytime Emmy Award for Outstanding Lead Actress in a Drama Series
 Gemini Award for Best Performance by an Actress in a Continuing Leading Dramatic Role
Golden Calf for Best Acting in a Television Drama (Pula Film Festival)
 Golden Globe Award for Best Actress – Miniseries or Television Film
 Golden Globe Award for Best Actress – Television Series Drama
 Golden Globe Award for Best Actress – Television Series Musical or Comedy
 Hum Award for Best Actress
 Hum Award for Best Actress Popular
 Lux Style Award for Best TV Actress
 NAACP Image Award for Outstanding Actress in a Daytime Drama Series
 NAACP Image Award for Outstanding Actress in a Drama Series
 NAACP Image Award for Outstanding Actress in a Television Movie, Mini-Series or Dramatic Special
 Primetime Emmy Award for Outstanding Lead Actress in a Comedy Series
 Primetime Emmy Award for Outstanding Lead Actress in a Drama Series
 Primetime Emmy Award for Outstanding Lead Actress in a Miniseries or a Movie
 Satellite Award for Best Actress – Miniseries or Television Film
 Satellite Award for Best Actress – Television Series Drama
 Satellite Award for Best Actress – Television Series Musical or Comedy
 Saturn Award for Best Actress on Television
 Screen Actors Guild Award for Outstanding Performance by a Female Actor in a Comedy Series
 Screen Actors Guild Award for Outstanding Performance by a Female Actor in a Drama Series
 Screen Actors Guild Award for Outstanding Performance by a Female Actor in a Miniseries or Television Movie
 Sun Kudumbam Best Actress Award
 TVB Anniversary Award for Best Actress

Theatre awards 
 Evening Standard Theatre Award for Best Actress
 Helpmann Award for Best Female Actor in a Musical
 Helpmann Award for Best Female Actor in a Play
 Helpmann Award for Best Female Performer in an Opera
 Laurence Olivier Award for Actress of the Year in a New Play
 Laurence Olivier Award for Actress of the Year in a Revival
 Laurence Olivier Award for Best Actress
 Laurence Olivier Award for Best Actress in a Musical
 Molière Award for Best Actress
 NAACP Theatre Award for Best Lead Female – Equity
 NAACP Theatre Award for Best Lead Female – Local
 Tony Award for Best Actress in a Play
 Tony Award for Best Actress in a Musical

References